The following lists events that happened in 1924 in El Salvador.

Incumbents
President: Alfonso Quiñónez Molina
Vice President: Pío Romero Bosque

Events

Births
 29 February – Carlos Humberto Romero, politician (d. 2017)

References

 
El Salvador
1920s in El Salvador
Years of the 20th century in El Salvador
El Salvador